The men's singles wheelchair tennis competition at the 2012 Summer Paralympics in London was held from 1 September to 8 September.

Defending gold medalist Shingo Kunieda of Japan defeated Stéphame Houdet of France in the final, 6–4, 6–2 to win the gold medal in men's singles wheelchair tennis at the 2012 London Paralympics. In the bronze-medal match, the Netherlands' Ronald Vink defeated compatriot Maikel Scheffers.

Calendar

Seeds

Draw

Key

INV = Bipartite invitation
ITF = ITF place
ALT = Alternative
r = Retired
w/o = Walkover

Finals

Top half

Section 1

Section 2

Bottom half

Section 3

Section 4

References 
 
 

Men's singles